Cook Islands competed at the 2016 Summer Olympics in Rio de Janeiro, Brazil, from 5 to 21 August 2016. This was the nation's eighth consecutive appearance at the Summer Olympics.

Cook Islands Sports and National Olympic Committee selected a team of nine athletes, four men and five women, for the Games across five different sports. It was the nation's largest delegation sent to the Olympics, beating the record of eight athletes who attended the London Games four years earlier. For the second straight time in history, Cook Islands was represented by more female than male athletes at an Olympic circuit.

The Cook Islands roster featured three returning Olympians from London 2012, including sprinter Patricia Taea (women's 100 m), weightlifter Luisa Peters (women's +75 kg), and slalom kayaker Ella Nicholas, who accepted the honor of being the nation's flag bearer in the opening ceremony, along with her older brother Bryden. Cook Islands, however, has yet to win an Olympic medal.

Athletics

Cook Islands has received universality slots from IAAF to send two athletes (one male and one female) to the Olympics.

Track & road events

Canoeing

Slalom
Cook Islands canoeists have qualified a maximum of one boat in each of the following classes. Because Australia and New Zealand both permitted to compete in the men's and women's K-1 through the 2015 ICF Canoe Slalom World Championships, the spots have been automatically awarded to the Cook Islands as no continental race would be held with less than three nations eligible.

Sailing
 
Sailors from the Cook Islands have qualified one boat each in men's Laser and women's Laser Radial class through the individual fleet World Championships, and Oceanian qualifying regattas.

M = Medal race; EL = Eliminated – did not advance into the medal race

Swimming

Cook Islands has received a Universality invitation from FINA to send two swimmers (one male and one female) to the Olympics.

Weightlifting

Cook Islands has received an invitation from the Tripartite Commission to send London 2012 Olympian Luisa Peters in the women's super heavyweight category (+75 kg) to the Olympics.

References

External links 
 

2016 in Cook Islands sport
2016
Nations at the 2016 Summer Olympics